Kosmati predsednik is a novel by Slovenian author Matjaž Podlogar. It was first published in 2010.

See also
List of Slovenian novels

Slovenian novels
2010 novels